Georgi Petrov (born 19 August 1988) is a Kazakh professional ice hockey defenceman who participated at the 2010 IIHF World Championship as a member of the Kazakhstan men's national ice hockey team.

References

1988 births
Sportspeople from Oskemen
Kazakhstani ice hockey defencemen
Kazakhstani people of Russian descent
Living people
Universiade medalists in ice hockey
Universiade silver medalists for Kazakhstan
Competitors at the 2011 Winter Universiade
Competitors at the 2013 Winter Universiade